Standfussiana defessa is a moth of the family Noctuidae. It is found on high altitudes in Lebanon, Syria and Israel.

Adults are on wing from May to August. There is one generation per year.

External links
 Noctuinae of Israel

Noctuinae
Insects of Turkey
Moths of the Middle East
Moths described in 1858